Conjugation or conjugate may refer to:

Linguistics
Grammatical conjugation, the modification of a verb from its basic form

Emotive conjugation or Russell's conjugation, the use of loaded language

Mathematics
Complex conjugation, the change of sign of the imaginary part of a complex number
Conjugate (square roots), the change of sign of a square root in an expression
Conjugate element (field theory), a generalization of the preceding conjugations to roots of a polynomial of any degree 
Conjugate transpose, the complex conjugate of the transpose of a matrix
Harmonic conjugate in complex analysis
Conjugate (graph theory), an alternative term for a line graph, i.e. a graph representing the edge adjacencies of another graph
In group theory, various notions are called conjugation: 
Inner automorphism, a type of conjugation homomorphism
Conjugation in group theory, related to matrix similarity in linear algebra
Conjugation (group theory), the image of an element under the conjugation homomorphisms
Conjugate closure, the image of a subgroup under the conjugation homomorphisms
Conjugate words in combinatorics; this operation on strings resembles conjugation in groups
Isogonal conjugate, in geometry
Conjugate gradient method, an algorithm for the numerical solution of particular systems of linear equations
Conjugate points, in differential geometry
Topological conjugation, which identifies equivalent dynamical systems
Convex conjugate, the ("dual") lower-semicontinuous convex function resulting from the Legendre–Fenchel transformation of a "primal" function

Probability and statistics
 Conjugate prior, in Bayesian statistics, a family of probability distributions that contains a prior and the posterior distributions for a particular likelihood function (particularly for one-parameter exponential families)
 Conjugate pairing of probability distributions, in the Fourier-analytic theory of characteristic functions and statistical mechanics

Science
Sexual conjugation, a type of isogamy in unicellular eukaryotes
Bacterial conjugation, a mechanism of exchange of genetic material between bacteria
Conjugate vaccine, in immunology
Conjugation (biochemistry), covalently linking a biomolecule with another molecule
Conjugate (acid-base theory), a system describing a conjugate acid-base pair
Conjugated system, a system of atoms covalently bonded with alternating single and multiple bonds
Conjugate variables (thermodynamics), pairs of variables that always change simultaneously
Conjugate quantities, observables that are linked by the Heisenberg uncertainty principle
Conjugate focal plane, in optics

See also
Conjugal (disambiguation)

Linguistics disambiguation pages
Mathematics disambiguation pages
Biology disambiguation pages